Jesse H. Jones Library is one of the central libraries at Baylor University in Waco, Texas. Built in 1992, Jones is smaller than the other central library, Moody Memorial Library. Jones connects with Moody by way of hallways on both the first and second floors.

References

Baylor University
Library buildings completed in 1992
Libraries in Waco, Texas
University and college academic libraries in the United States